Saletti (Atessa)   is a frazione  in the province of Chieti in the Abruzzo region of Italy.

Frazioni of the Province of Chieti